Gold Key Comics was originally an imprint of American company Western Publishing, created for comic books distributed to newsstands. Also known as Whitman Comics, Gold Key operated this way from 1962 to 1984. Currently, Gold Key Comics is owned by Gold Key Entertainment LLC, which consists of business partners and comic book enthusiasts Lance Linderman, Adam Brooks, Mike Dynes, and Arnold Guerrero.

History
Gold Key Comics  was created in 1962, when its parent, Western Publishing Company, switched to in-house publishing rather than packaging content for branding and distribution by its business partner, Dell Comics. Hoping to make their comics more like traditional children's books, they initially eliminated panel line-borders, using just the panel, with its ink and artwork evenly edged, but not bordered by a "container" line. Within a year, they had reverted to using inked panel borders and oval balloons. They experimented with new formats, including Whitman Comic Book, a black-and-white, 136-page, hardcover series consisting of reprints, and Golden Picture Story Book, a tabloid-sized, 52-page, hardcover containing new material. In 1967, Gold Key reprinted a number of selected issues of their comics under the title Top Comics. They were packaged in plastic bags containing five comics each and were sold at gas stations and various eateries. Like Dell, Gold Key was one of the few major American comic book publishers never to display the Comics Code Authority seal on its covers.

Properties
Gold Key featured a number of licensed properties and several original titles, including a number of publications that were spun off from Dell's Four Color series, or were published as stand-alone titles. Gold Key maintained decent sales numbers throughout the 1960s, due to its offering of many titles based upon popular TV series of the day, as well as numerous titles based on both Walt Disney Studios and Warner Bros. animated properties. It was also the first company to publish comic books based upon the current NBC TV series Star Trek. While some titles, such as Star Trek and The Twilight Zone, were published for many years, many other licensed titles were characterized by short runs, sometimes publishing no more than one or two issues. Gold Key considered suing over the similarly themed television series Lost in Space for its resemblance to the preexisting Space Family Robinson, but decided their business relationship with CBS and Irwin Allen was more important than any monetary reward resulting from such a suit; as a result, the Gold Key series adopted the branding Space Family Robinson Lost in Space with issue #15 (Jan. 1966), though its narrative had no connection to the TV series.

Editor Chase Craig stated that Gold Key would launch titles with Hanna-Barbera characters with direct adaptations of episodes of the program because "[t]he studio had approval rights and the people there could get pointlessly picky about the material ... but they rarely bothered looking at any issue after the first few. Therefore, it simplified the procedure to do the first and maybe the second issue as an adaptation. They couldn't very well complain that a plot taken from the show was inappropriate".

Over the years, Gold Key lost several properties, including the King Features Syndicate characters (Popeye, Flash Gordon, The Phantom, etc.), to Charlton Comics in 1966, numerous, but not all, Hanna-Barbera characters also to Charlton Comics in 1970, and Star Trek to Marvel Comics in 1979.

Creators
The stable of writers and artists built up by Western Publishing during the Dell Comics era mostly continued into the Gold Key era. In the mid-1960s, a number of artists were recruited by the newly formed Disney Studio Program and thereafter divided their output between the Disney Program and Western. Writer/artist Russ Manning and editor Chase Craig launched the Magnus, Robot Fighter science-fiction series in 1963. Jack Sparling co-created the superhero Tiger Girl with Jerry Siegel in 1968, drew the toyline tie-in Microbots one-shot, and illustrated comic book adaptations of the television series Family Affair and Adam-12. Dan Spiegle worked on Space Family Robinson, The Green Hornet, The Invaders, Korak, Son of Tarzan, Brothers of the Spear, and many of Gold Key's mystery/occult titles. Among the other creators at Gold Key were writers Donald F. Glut, Len Wein, Bob Ogle, John David Warner, Steve Skeates, and Mark Evanier; and artists Cliff Voorhees, Joe Messerli, Carol Lay, Jesse Santos, and Mike Royer. Glut created and wrote several series including The Occult Files of Dr. Spektor, Dagar the Invincible, and Tragg and the Sky Gods. Also in the 1970s, writer Bob Gregory started drawing stories, mostly for Daisy and Donald. Artist/writer Frank Miller had his first published comic book artwork in The Twilight Zone for Gold Key in 1978.

Diana Gabaldon began her career writing for Gold Key, initially sending a query that stated, "I’ve been reading your comics for the last 25 years, and they’ve been getting worse and worse. I’m not sure if I could do better myself, but I’d like to try." Editor Del Connell provided a script sample and bought her second submission.

According to former Western Publishing writer Mark Evanier, during the mid-1960s, comedy writer Jerry Belson, whose writing partner at the time was Garry Marshall, also did scripts for Gold Key while writing for leading TV sitcoms like The Dick Van Dyke Show. Among the comics for which he wrote were The Flintstones, Uncle Scrooge, Daffy Duck, Bugs Bunny, The Three Stooges, and Woody Woodpecker.

Leo Dorfman, creator of Ghosts for DC Comics, also produced supernatural stories for Gold Key's similarly themed Twilight Zone, Ripley's Believe it or Not, Boris Karloff Tales of Mystery, and Grimm's Ghost Stories. One of Gold Key's editors at the time told Mark Evanier, "Leo writes stories and then he decides whether he's going to sell them to DC [for Ghosts] or to us. He tells us that if they come out good, they go to us and if they don't, they go to DC. I assume he tells DC the opposite."

Editor Frank Tedeschi, who left in 1973 for a job in book publishing, helped bring in such new comics professionals as Walt Simonson, Gerry Boudreau, and John David Warner.

Later years
During the 1970s, the entire comics industry experienced a downswing and Gold Key was among the hardest hit. Its editorial policies had not kept pace with the changing times, and suffered an erosion of its base of sales among children, who instead of buying comic books, could now watch cartoons and other entertainment on television for free. It is also alleged by Carmine Infantino that in the mid to late 1960s, DC Comics attempted to pressure Gold Key from the comics business through sheer volume of output. Among the original titles launched by Gold Key in the 1970s were Baby Snoots and Wacky Witch. By 1977, many of the company's series had been cancelled and the surviving titles featured more reprinted material, although Gold Key was able to obtain the rights to publish a comic book series based upon Buck Rogers in the 25th Century between 1979 and 1981. It also lost the rights to publish Star Trek-based comic books to Marvel Comics just prior to the revival of the franchise via Star Trek: The Motion Picture, with the final Gold Key-published Star Trek title being issued in March, 1979.

In this period, Gold Key experimented with digests with some success. In a similar manner, to explore new markets in the mid-1970s, it produced a four-volume series, with somewhat better production values and printing aimed at the emerging collector market, containing classic stories of the Disney characters by Carl Barks and Floyd Gottfredson (Best of Walt Disney's Comics). In the late 1970s, somewhat higher-grade reprints of various licensed characters were also aimed at new venues (Dynabrites), plus Starstream, a four-issue series adapting classic science fiction stories by authors such as Isaac Asimov and John W. Campbell. Golden Press released trade paperback reprint collections such as Walt Disney Christmas Parade, Bugs Bunny Comics-Go-Round, and Star Trek: The Enterprise Logs.

In the late 1970s, the distribution of comic books on spinners and racks at newsstands, drug stores, and supermarkets continued, but Western Publishing also sold packages of three comics in a plastic bag to toy and department stores, gas stations, airports, and bus/train stations, "as well as other outlets that weren't conducive to conventional comic racks". The newsstand comics were returnable; the dealer could return unsold copies to the distributor for a refund, but the bagged comics were not. To discourage unscrupulous dealers from opening the plastic bags and returning the nonreturnable issues, Western published the newsstand versions under the Gold Key Comics label, and put the Whitman Comics logo on the bagged versions, although otherwise the issues were identical.

Western, at one point, also distributed bagged comics from its rival DC Comics under the Whitman logo. Former DC Comics executive Paul Levitz stated, "[The] Western program was enormous — even well into the 1970s, they were taking very large numbers of DC titles for distribution (I recall 50,000+ copies offhand)."

In 1979, Western ceased to be an independent company when Mattel Inc. purchased the company. The new management stopped selling returnable comics at newsstands, preferring the nonreturnable bagged comics sold at toy stores.

In a 1993 interview, Del Connell, the managing editor at Western's West Coast office in the late 1970s, recalled,

Eventually, arrangements were made to distribute these releases to the nascent national network of comic-book stores. Western also prepared a prospectus in the early 1980s for a deluxe Carl Barks reprint project aimed at the collector market that was never published.

In December 1983, a struggling Mattel sold Western Publishing to real-estate investor Richard A. Bernstein. Bernstein closed Western's comic-book publishing division in 1984.

Relaunches, reprints, and legacy
Three of Gold Key's original characters, Magnus, Robot Fighter, Doctor Solar, and Turok, Son of Stone, were used in the 1990s to launch Valiant Comics' fictional universe.

Dark Horse Comics (and later, Dynamite Entertainment) have published reprints, including several in hardcover collections, of such original Gold Key titles as Magnus, Robot Fighter; Doctor Solar; Mighty Samson; M.A.R.S. Patrol; Turok: Son of Stone; The Occult Files of Doctor Spektor; Dagar the Invincible; Boris Karloff's Tales of Mystery; Space Family Robinson; Flash Gordon; the Jesse Marsh drawn Tarzan;
 and some of the Russ Manning-produced Tarzan series. They started several revivals of characters under Jim Shooter, including Doctor Solar, Magnus, Turok, and 
Mighty Samson. The Checker Book Publishing Group, in conjunction with Paramount Pictures, began reprinting the Gold Key Star Trek series in 2004. Hermes Press reprinted the three series based on Irwin Allen's science-fiction TV series, as well as Gold Key's Dark Shadows, My Favorite Martian, and the Phantom.

Bongo Comics published a parody of Gold Key in Radioactive Man #106 (volume 2 #6, Nov. 2002) with script/layout by Batton Lash and finished art by Mike DeCarlo that Tony Isabella dubbed "a nigh-flawless facsimile of the Gold Key comics published by Western in the early 1960s...from the painting with tasteful come-on copy on the front cover to the same painting, sans logo or other type, presented as a "pin-up" on the back cover".

In June 2001, DIC Entertainment announced they would purchase Golden Books Family Entertainment for million (equivalent to $ million in ) and take it out of bankruptcy. However, DIC would pass off the purchase due to high costs and instead Golden Books Family Entertainment was eventually acquired jointly by Classic Media, owner of the catalog of United Productions of America, and book publisher Random House in a bankruptcy auction for the lower $84.4million (equivalent to $ million in ) on August 16, 2001. In turn, Random House, and Classic Media gained ownership of Golden Books' entertainment catalog (including the family entertainment catalog of Broadway Video which includes the pre-1974 library of Rankin/Bass Productions and the library of Total Television), as well as production, licensing, and merchandising rights for Golden Books' characters and the Gold Key Comics catalogs, while Random House gained Golden Books' book publishing properties.  Random House had previously acquired Dell Publishing though a series of mergers since 1976, effectively reuniting the remnants Gold Key Comics and Dell Comics.

On July 23, 2012, Classic Media was acquired by DreamWorks Animation for $155million (equivalent to $ million in ) and renamed DreamWorks Classics. On July 1, 2013, Random House merged with the Penguin Group, forming a new company called Penguin Random House. In April 2016, the acquisition of DreamWorks Animation (owner of DreamWorks Classics) by NBCUniversal was announced.

In 2021, comics creator and hacker Robert Willis obtained the trademark. Later that year the trademark was purchased by the newly-formed Gold Key Entertainment LLC. The new ownership consists of comic book enthusiasts Lance Linderman, Adam Brooks, Mike Dynes, and Arnold Guerrero. Gold Key Entertainment is currently working with creators to produce new titles as well as reviving some familiar titles, all staying true to the classic Gold Key aesthetic.

List of titles

Original series

Licensed series

Movie Comics
In addition to ongoing series, Gold Key also published many standalone single-issue film adaptations, primarily based on titles from Walt Disney Studios.

References

External links
Western (publisher) at the Grand Comics Database

Penguin Random House
Gold Key Comics
American companies established in 1962
American companies disestablished in 1984
Comic book publishing companies of the United States
Defunct comics and manga publishing companies
Western Publishing
Book publishing companies based in New York (state)
Publishing companies based in New York City
Publishing companies established in 1962
Publishing companies disestablished in 1984
1962 establishments in New York City
1984 disestablishments in New York (state)
Disney comics publishers
DreamWorks Classics
Lists of comics by publisher